Yuraqqucha (Quechua yuraq white, qucha lake, "white lake", Hispanicized spelling Yuraccocha) is a mountain in the Andes of Peru, about  high. It is located in the Junín Region, Yauli Province, Morococha District, and in the Lima Region, Huarochirí Province, Chicla District. Yuraqqucha lies northwest of a lake named Waqraqucha, the Antikuna mountain pass and the peak of Antikuna. Anta Q'asa, Sillaqaqa, Inka Kancha and Pukaqucha are situated west, southwest and northwest of Yuraqqucha.

The mountain is named after a little lake south of it.

References

Mountains of Peru
Mountains of Lima Region
Mountains of Junín Region
Lakes of Peru
Lakes of Lima Region